Love Songs may refer to:

Film
 Love Songs (1930 film), a French-German musical film
 Love Songs (1984 film) or Paroles et Musique, a French-Canadian film
 Love Songs (1999 film), a television film starring Louis Gossett Jr.
 Love Songs (2007 film), a French film directed by Christophe Honoré

Music
 Love Songs, an American punk band led by Craig Billmeier

Albums
 Love Songs (Anne Sofie von Otter and Brad Mehldau album), 2010
 Love Songs (Ayumi Hamasaki album), 2010
 Love Songs (Babyface album), 2001
 Love Songs (Barbra Streisand album), 1981
 Love Songs (Barry White album), 2003
 Love Songs (Beatles album), 1977
Love Songs (Bee Gees album), 2005
 Love Songs (Billy Ray Cyrus album), 2008
 Love Songs (The Carpenters album), 1997
 Love Songs (Chicago album), 2005
 Love Songs (Cliff Richard album), 1981
 Love Songs (Dan Fogelberg album), 1995
 Love Songs (David Sanborn album), 1995
Love Songs (Destiny's Child album), 2013
 Love Songs (Earth, Wind & Fire album), 2004
 Love Songs (Elton John album), 1995
 Love Songs (Frank Sinatra album), 2001
 Love Songs (Gipsy Kings album), 1996
 Love Songs (Glen Campbell album), 2000
 Love Songs (Harry Watters album), 2005
 Love Songs (Heart album), 2006
 Love Songs (Jennifer Love Hewitt album), 1992
 Love Songs (John Farnham album), 2002
 Love Songs (Johnny Gill album), 2005
 Love Songs (Julio Iglesias album), 2004
 Love Songs (Mariah Carey album), 2010
 Love Songs (Michael Franks album), 2004
 Love Songs (Michael Jackson album), 2002
 Love Songs (Miles Davis album), 1999
 Love Songs (Nat King Cole album), 2003
 Love Songs (Neil Sedaka album), 2005
 Love Songs (Rick Astley album), 2004
 Love Songs (Santana album), 2004
 Love Songs (Tina Turner album), 2014
 Love Songs (Trisha Yearwood album), 2008
 Love Songs (UB40 album), 2009
 Love Songs (Vanessa Williams album), 2004
 Love Songs (Whitesnake album), 2020
 Love Songs (Willie Nelson album), 1986
 Love Songs (Yanni album), 1999
 Love Songs: A Compilation... Old and New, by Phil Collins, 2004
Love Songs – Koi Uta, by Shion Miyawaki, 2009
 Love Songs, by Aretha Franklin, 2001
 Love Songs, by Billy Nicholls, 1974
 Love Songs, by Bobby Vinton, 2003
 Love Songs, a compilation album by Collin Raye, 2000
 Love Songs, a compilation album by Diana Ross, 1984
 Love Songs, by George Earth, 2004
 Love Songs, by the Jean-Paul Sartre Experience, 1986
 Love Songs, a compilation album by John Michael Montgomery, 2002
 Love Songs, by Jordan Knight, 2006
 Love Songs, by Kenny Rogers, 1997 and 2002
 Love Songs, by Michael Jackson and Diana Ross, 1987
 Love Songs, by Natalie Cole, 2001
 Love Songs, by Peter Yarrow, 1975
 Love Songs, by the Soldiers, 2010
 Love Songs, by Vanessa Paradis, 2013

Songs
 "Love Songs" (Daryl Braithwaite song), 2020
 "Love Songs" (Kaash Paige song), 2018
 "Lovesongs (They Kill Me)", by Cinema Bizarre, 2007
 "Love Songs", by Benjamin Ingrosso from Identification, 2018

Arts and entertainment
 Love Songs, a 1972 novel by Lawrence Sanders
 "Love Songs", a 2005–2007 art installation by Mary Kelly

Other uses
 Lovesongs (Luther Vandross album), 2009

See also
 Greatest Love Songs (disambiguation)
 Love Song (disambiguation)
 The Love Songs (disambiguation)
 Song of Love (disambiguation)
 Love Thongs, or Stay Black, a 2016 EP by Damien Done